Bo Gösta Ingemar Bernhardsson (born 19 July 1949) is a Swedish social democratic politician, member of the Riksdag 1991–1995 and then again in 2002.

References
Bo Bernhardsson (S)

Members of the Riksdag from the Social Democrats
Living people
1949 births
Articles containing video clips
Members of the Riksdag 2002–2006